This is a partial and outdated list of public artworks in Santa Monica, California in the United States.  This list contains only 28 artworks, does not list any artworks installed after 2010, and incorrectly includes private works of art.

References

External links

Santa Monica Cultural Affairs Public Art website

California culture
Santa Monica
Lists of public art in California
Public art
Tourist attractions in California